Evergreen, also known as the Callaway-Deyerle House, is an historic home located near Rocky Mount, Franklin County, Virginia. The original section, now the rear ell, was built about 1840, is a two-story, two bay, rectangular brick dwelling with a hipped roof in a vernacular Greek Revival style.  A two-story front section in the Italianate style was added about 1861. A side gable and wing addition was built at the same time. Also on the property are a contributing silo (c. 1861), barn (c. 1920), and tenant house (c. 1930).   The silo on site is one of the earliest all brick grain silos in this part of the country.

Part of the original estate was built by Benjamin Deyerle.

It was listed on the National Register of Historic Places in 1999.

References

Houses on the National Register of Historic Places in Virginia
Houses completed in 1861
Greek Revival houses in Virginia
Italianate architecture in Virginia
Houses in Franklin County, Virginia
National Register of Historic Places in Franklin County, Virginia
1861 establishments in Virginia